Baara (international title: Work) is a 1978 film directed by Souleymane Cissé. It was the first ever feature film to be produced in Mali. The film has been screened at multiple international film festivals, and it has won a number of awards.

Synopsis 
A young Malian peasant works as a baara, that is to say a baggage carrier in Bamako. He becomes acquainted with a young, progressive engineer who introduces him to a job at a factory.

Cast 
 Ismaïla Saar
 Niare Baba
 Keita Boubacar
 Balla Moussa Keita
 Oumou Diarra

Awards and accolades 
 Étalon de Yennenga (FESPACO, Ouagadougou)
 Golden Montgolfiere (Three Continents Festival, Nantes)
 Jury Prize (Locarno Festival of Film, Locarno)

References

External links 
 

1978 films
Malian drama films